Calogero Joseph Salvatore Maurici (born 30 July 1971), better known as Calogero, is a French singer.

Early life
Calogero was born in Échirolles, Isère, to Sicilian-born Italian parents from Sommatino, Caltanissetta, Sicily.

Early years
By the age of six, Calogero had already taken an interest in music. He quickly learned to play several instruments, including the flute, piano, and bass

As part of Les Charts

In 1986 he became the lead singer and songwriter for a band called Les Charts he started with his brother, Gioacchino Maurici, and a childhood friend, Francis Maggiulli. Between 1989 and 1997, Les Charts released five albums, L'Océan sans fond (1989), Notre monde à nous  (1991), Hannibal (1994), Acte 1 (1995), their most successful charting album, and Changer (1997). After break-up, all members of Les Charts continued with solo musical careers, but continued to co-write songs together, first under the name of Calogero Bros., and later listing their individual names.

Solo career
As the band began to lose its momentum, Calogero decided to launch himself as a solo artist and gathered important connections by writing songs and collaborating with already popular artists such as Zazie and Pascal Obispo. The latter helped produce Calogero's first solo album Au milieu des Autres (2000). His second album, Calogero (2002), was a huge success, with the hit singles "En apesanteur" (In Weightlessness), "Aussi libre que moi" (As Free as Me), "Tien an men" and "Prendre racine" (To Take Root). Finally, in 2004, Calogero released 3, featuring "Face à la mer", a duet with French rapper Passi, and several other top singles, such as "Yalla" and "Si seulement je pouvais lui manquer". 
   
Calogero's moving lyrics and frail, tender voice have made him one of France's top pop/rock singers.

Calogero released his fourth studio album Pomme C on 12 March 2007.

Collaborations as composer
Since the late 1990s, Calogero composed songs for many artists, often in collaboration with his brother Gioacchino. For example, he composed songs for Florent Pagny ("Châtelet-les-Halles"), Hélène Ségara ("Au Nom d'une Femme" and "Regarde"), Ismael Lo ("L'Amour a tous les droits" and "Faut qu'on s'aime"), Pascal Obispo ("Millésime"), Jenifer Bartoli ("C'est de l'or"), Julie Zenatti ("La Vérité m'attire" et "Toutes les douleurs"), Patrick Fiori ("Que tu reviennes", "Être là", "Encore", "Tout le monde", "Tera umana" et "Il n'y a pas grand chose à dire"), Fred Blondin ("Je manque de toi" and "Perso et les Aimants"), Mario Barravecchia ("On se ressemble"). He also composed three songs for the musical The Ten Commandments: "Je n'avais jamais prié", "Une Raison d'espérer" and "Y'a tant d'amour".

Calogero also participates in numerous charities. He is currently member of Les Enfoirés; he also participated in the single "Noël ensemble", recorded by many artists in 2002; he sang for the Sidaction with Jenifer; and recently, he participated in the single "Douce France", led by Marc Lavoine, to fight discrimination and help young people to find work.

In 2008, Stanislas Renoult recorded a duet with Calogero entitled "La Débâcle des sentiments".

Musical style
Calogero describes his own musical style as "pop rock". He also said that he listens to the musical work of various artists, such as Barbara, William Sheller, The Cure and The Who, and that "words and melodies are very important to [him]".

He has a great admiration for the Beatles, especially for Paul McCartney, whose song "Live and Let Die" is covered on Live 1.0. Calogero said about McCartney, "Paul McCartney? A myth [legend]! For all bassists he is Uncle Paul". Between his first solo album and his last tour, the musical style evolved significantly to a more percussive rock, and he also said that his fourth album, Pomme C, had the closest sound to him.

Calogero is a bass player but he also plays keyboards and guitar. His initial musical training was on the organ. On his first solo album, he plays the guitar, while on the next two he plays bass. He is left handed and sings about this in the song "Conduire en Angleterre".

In Circus

Starting 2012, the French band Circus was established that included Calogero as well as Stanislas, Philippe Uminski, Elsa Fourlon and Karen Brunon, all already established artists. Their debut self-titled album Circus was released in 2012.

Discography

Studio albums 
 Au milieu des autres (2000)
 Calogero (2002)
 3 (2004)
 Pomme C (2007)
 L'Embellie (2009)
 Les feux d'artifice (2014)
 Liberté chérie (2017)
 Centre Ville (2020)

Live albums 
 Live 1.0 (2005)
 Live symphonique (2011)
 Live 2015 (2015)

Compilation albums 
 V.O.-V.S. (2010)

References

External links

 Calogero Official Website
Biography of Calogero, from Radio France Internationale

1971 births
Living people
People from Échirolles
French pop singers
French bass guitarists
Male bass guitarists
French people of Italian descent
French people of Sicilian descent
21st-century French singers
21st-century bass guitarists
21st-century French male singers
French male guitarists